Rudra Madhab Ray (23 November 1937 – 31 May 2016) was an Indian politician. He was a member of the Indian Parliament, and represented  Kandhamal (Lok Sabha constituency).
He was suspended from Biju Janata Dal on 12 April 2014 for his alleged role in anti-party activities.
Rudramadhab died on 31 May 2016 after prolonged illness.

References

1937 births
2016 deaths
Bharatiya Janata Party politicians from Odisha
India MPs 2009–2014
Lok Sabha members from Odisha
People from Kandhamal district
Janata Party politicians
Janata Dal politicians
Janata Party (Secular) politicians
Biju Janata Dal politicians